An Evening of Love (Spanish:Un Atardecer de amor) is a 1943 Argentine romantic drama film directed and written by Rogelio Geissmann.The film starred Floren Delbene and Ana Arneodo.

Cast

Ana Arneodo
Sara Barrié
Gloria Bayardo
Nélida Bilbao
Eloísa Cañizares
Adrián Cuneo
Floren Delbene
Lidia Denis
Jorge Salcedo
Judith Sulian
Martha Donnia Burton (girl)

External links
 

1943 films
1940s Spanish-language films
Argentine black-and-white films
1943 romantic drama films
Films scored by Julián Bautista
Argentine romantic drama films
1940s Argentine films